is a Japanese football player currently playing for Hokkaido Consadole Sapporo.

Club career stats
Updated to 18 February 2020.

References

External links
Profile at Consadole Sapporo

1993 births
Living people
Association football people from Hokkaido
Japanese footballers
J1 League players
J2 League players
Hokkaido Consadole Sapporo players
Footballers at the 2014 Asian Games
Association football midfielders
Sportspeople from Sapporo
Asian Games competitors for Japan
21st-century Japanese people